The Bukowsko–Nowotaniec wind farm south of village Bukowsko, Poland, is  the second wind-farm project planned by Martifer Renewables and REpower in Poland.  
The project "Bukowsko" comprises eight REpower MM92 turbines, each with a rated output of 2 megawatts (MW).  This is the first wind-farm project undertaken in Poland by Germany's third-largest wind-turbine manufacturer. The projects is located in the south-east of the Sanok county

References 

Proposed renewable energy power stations in Poland
2009 establishments in Poland
Wind farms in Poland
Sanok County
Buildings and structures in Podkarpackie Voivodeship